Dads is an American documentary film directed by Bryce Dallas Howard in her feature film directorial debut. The film follows a portrait of contemporary fatherhood. It features celebrity fathers including Ron Howard, Jimmy Fallon, Judd Apatow, Jimmy Kimmel, Will Smith, Hasan Minhaj, Ken Jeong and Kenan Thompson, and everyday men around the world.

It had its world premiere at the Toronto International Film Festival on September 6, 2019. It was released on June 19, 2020, by Apple TV+.

Synopsis
A portrait of contemporary fatherhood, the film blends the reflections of Howard's own father, film director Ron Howard, other Hollywood celebrity fathers and everyday men from around the world on what being a father means to them.

Cast

 Judd Apatow
 Jimmy Fallon
 Neil Patrick Harris
 Ron Howard
 Ken Jeong
 Jimmy Kimmel
 Hasan Minhaj
 Conan O'Brien
 Patton Oswalt
 Will Smith
 Kenan Thompson
 Rance Howard
 Reed Howard
 Glen Henry
 Robert Selby
 Thiago Queiroz
 Shuichi Sakuma
 Rob Scheer
 Reece Scheer

Production
In October 2018, it was announced Bryce Dallas Howard would direct the film, with Imagine Entertainment producing.

Release
The film premiered at the 2019 Toronto International Film Festival, where it was named second runner-up for the People's Choice Award for Documentaries. Prior to, Apple TV+ acquired distribution rights to the film. It was released on June 19, 2020.

Critical response
The review aggregator Rotten Tomatoes reported that 94% of critics gave the film positive reviews based on 35 reviews, with an average rating of 7.1/10. The site's critics consensus reads, "As solidly dependable as the fathers it depicts, Dads pays affectionate -- and affecting -- tribute to some of the many ways parents can make a difference." At Metacritic, the film has a weighted average score of 59 out of 100 based on 5 critics, indicating "mixed or average reviews".

Tomris Laffly  of Variety wrote: "It’s mostly a vanilla documentary with no real destination, but one with plenty of cuteness to go around."

References

External links
 

2019 directorial debut films
2019 films
American documentary films
Apple TV+ original films
Documentary films about families
Documentary films about men
Films produced by Brian Grazer
Films produced by Ron Howard
Imagine Entertainment films
2020s English-language films
Films directed by Bryce Dallas Howard
2010s English-language films
2010s American films